Adwan (also spelled Edwan) may refer to:

People
Banu 'Adwan, a division of the Banu 'Amr tribe, which is a branch of the Zahran tribe.
 Atef Adwan (born 1952), Palestinian politician
 Georges Adwan (born 1947), Lebanese politician
 Kamal Adwan, PLO spokesman killed in 1973 Israeli raid on Lebanon
 Mamdouh Adwan (1941-2004) Syrian Poet and writer

Places
Adwan, Syria, village in southern Syria
Qarn Bin `Adwan, a village in the Hadhramaut Governorate in eastern Yemen

See also
Jamilah bint Adwan (born 180 CE), an ancestor of the Islamic prophet Muhammad on both his paternal and maternal sides
Adwan Rebellion or the Balqa Revolt, a 1923 revolt, the largest uprising against the newly established Transjordanian government, headed by Mezhar Ruslan, during its first years

Arabic-language surnames